Panamá is a district (distrito) of Panamá Province in Panama. The population according to the 2010 census was 880,691; the latest official estimate (for 2019) is 1,183,333. The district covers a total area of 2,031 km². The district seat is Panama City.

Administrative divisions
Panamá District is divided administratively into the following corregimientos:

24 de Diciembre
Ancón
Bella Vista
Betania
Calidonia
Chilibre
Curundú
El Chorrillo
Juan Díaz
Las Cumbres
Las Mañanitas
Pacora

Parque Lefevre
Pedregal
Pueblo Nuevo
Río Abajo
San Felipe
San Francisco
San Martín
Santa Ana
Tocumen
Alcalde Díaz
Ernesto Córdoba Campos
Caimitillo

References